Sproul is an unincorporated community in Blair County, Pennsylvania, United States. Sproul had a post office until September 28, 2002; it still has its own ZIP code, 16682.

References

Unincorporated communities in Blair County, Pennsylvania
Unincorporated communities in Pennsylvania